The Chinese Pagoda is a landmark in Birmingham, England.  It is a 40-foot (12 m) granite carving of a Chinese pagoda, carved in Fujian, China and donated to the city by the Wing Yip brothers, founder of a local Chinese supermarket chain, in thanks to the city and its people for providing a home for them and their families and for the city's support over the years.

The pagoda was erected in 1998 and the surrounding area turned into a Feng Shui garden with a large Taijitu embedded in the pavement.

Located in the centre of the Holloway Circus roundabout on the Inner Ring Road, it forms a landmark for the nearby Chinese Quarter of the city and is seen by over 60,000 motorists a day.

References

Further reading 
 

Buildings and structures in Birmingham, West Midlands